This list of people on the cover of FHM magazine 2007–present is a catalog of women who have appeared on the cover of the Indian edition of FHM magazine, starting with the magazine's inaugural issue in October 2007.

2007

2008

2009

2010

2011

2012

2013

2014

2015

2016

2017

2018

2019

2020

References

FHM (India)
FHM (India)
FHM (India)
FHM (India)
Lists of 21st-century people